The prehensile-tailed porcupines or coendous (genus Coendou) are found in Central and South America. Two other formerly recognized Neotropical tree porcupine genera, Echinoprocta and Sphiggurus, have been subsumed into Coendou, since Sphiggurus was shown by genetic studies to be polyphyletic, while Echinoprocta nested within Coendou.

Characteristics 
Among the most notable features of Coendou porcupines are their unspined prehensile tails. The front and hind feet are also modified for grasping. These limbs all contribute to making this animal an adept climber, an adaptation to living most of their lives in trees.

They feed on leaves, shoots, fruits, bark, roots, and buds. They can be pests of plantation crops. They also make a distinctive "baby-like" sound to communicate in the wild.

Their young are born with soft hair that hardens to quills with age. Adults are slow-moving and will roll into a ball when threatened and on the ground. The record longevity is 27 years.

Species 
Genus Coendou - prehensile-tailed porcupines
Baturite porcupine - C. baturitensis - a newly discovered species
Bicolored-spined porcupine - C. bicolor
Streaked dwarf porcupine - C. ichillus
Bahia porcupine - C. insidiosus
Black-tailed hairy dwarf porcupine - C. melanurus
Mexican hairy dwarf porcupine - C. mexicanus
Black dwarf porcupine - C. nycthemera
Amazonian long-tailed porcupine - C. longicaudatus
Brazilian porcupine - C. prehensilis
Frosted hairy dwarf porcupine - C. pruinosus
Andean porcupine - C. quichua
Roosmalen's dwarf porcupine - C. roosmalenorum
Stump-tailed porcupine - C. rufescens
Santa Marta porcupine - C. sanctamartae
C. speratus - a newly discovered species
Paraguaian hairy dwarf porcupine - C. spinosus
Brown hairy dwarf porcupine - C. vestitus

References

 
 
 

Coendou
Mammals of Guyana